John 'Johnny' Slade (1932-1991) was an Australian rugby league footballer who played in the 1950s.

Playing career
Originally from the Stockton, New South Wales area, Slade was a fullback for the Parramatta Eels between 1953 and 1955, then in 1958 and 1959. 

He is remembered for his long range kicking, especially his kicking duels with rival fullbacks and was a crowd favourite at Cumberland Oval. Slade played 77 games with Parramatta in his career, scoring 16 tries, 36 goals and two field goals for a total of 124 points. He also holds the record as the youngest first grade captain-coach when he coached the blue and golds in 1955 at age 23, being the last coach of the club to avoid the wooden spoon until Ken Kearney seven seasons later. 

He returned to Newcastle at the end of his playing career.

Death
Slade died on 4 February 1991, aged 59.

References

1932 births
1991 deaths
Australian rugby league players
Date of birth missing
Parramatta Eels captains
Parramatta Eels coaches
Parramatta Eels players
Rugby league fullbacks
Rugby league players from Newcastle, New South Wales